

The Blériot X was an unfinished early French aeroplane by Louis Blériot. Its design was quite unlike anything else he had built and was modelled closely on the successful aircraft of the Wright brothers: a pusher biplane with elevators and rudders carried on outriggers. After exhibiting it at the Salon de l'Automobile et de l'Aéronautique in Paris in December 1908, Bleriot abandoned it and returned to developing his increasingly successful monoplane designs.

Specifications

References

 
 
 Devaux, Jean and Michel Marani. "Les Douze Premiers Aéroplanes de Louis Blériot". Pegase No 54, May 1989.
 Nova: A Daring Flight
 earlyaviators.com

1900s French experimental aircraft
10
Canard aircraft
Single-engined pusher aircraft
Biplanes